B. grandis may refer to:
 Baeckea grandis, a shrub species in the genus Baeckea
 Banksia grandis, the bull banksia, giant banksia or mangite, a common and distinctive tree species found in South West Western Australia
 Beishanlong grandis, a giant ornithomimosaurian dinosaur from the Early Cretaceous of China
 Boehmeria grandis, a flowering plant species in the genus Boehmeria
 Buchenavia grandis, a plant species in the genus Buchenavia

See also
 Grandis (disambiguation)